Dancing Lessons may refer to:

Television 
An episode of the American action-drama television series The Unit.

Theater 
A play by American playwright Mark St. Germain.